Sergey Nikolayevich Skripka (born 9 January 1950) is a Soviet middle-distance runner. He competed in the men's 3000 metres steeplechase at the 1972 Summer Olympics.

References

1950 births
Living people
Athletes (track and field) at the 1972 Summer Olympics
Soviet male middle-distance runners
Soviet male steeplechase runners
Olympic athletes of the Soviet Union
Place of birth missing (living people)